Hka River or Nam Hka is a river of Shan State, Burma. It is a left hand tributary of the Salween.

Historically this river separated the Wa States and the northern Shan state of Manglon from Kengtung State.

Course
The Nam Hka forms the boundary between Burma and China in its upper course when it flows roughly southwards. It bends westwards at Pangkham, located at the bend of the river, until it joins the left bank of the Salween.

See also
List of rivers in Burma

References

External links
The Rise and Fall of the Communist Party of Burma

Rivers of Myanmar
China–Myanmar border